Con is a television series on Comedy Central in which con artist Skyler Stone revealed the secrets of his profession by performing confidence tricks, scams, and hoaxes of various degrees of complexity on camera. These could range from simply claiming that an order for food was botched, to claiming to be a certain profession, which required training (received through cons). In one episode Stone showed how he received free soft drinks at fast food restaurants by retaining paper cups from various fast food restaurants and then refilling them at soda fountains. Most of his cons revolved around him claiming that he is filming a television show or movie of some sort, and that the product or service he wished to acquire would be advertised in the film or show. The products did wind up getting free advertisement – but on Con, not where they were told.

External links
 

Comedy Central original programming
2000s American comedy television series
2005 American television series debuts
2005 American television series endings